Taylor Potts (born October 13, 1987) is a former American football quarterback. He played college football at Texas Tech, and was signed by the St. Louis Rams as an undrafted free agent in 2011. He was waived during training camp, and then signed as a free agent by the San Diego Chargers in May 2012, where he was expected to compete for the third-string quarterback position.

Potts served as a backup for nationally renowned quarterback Graham Harrell and took over the starting role for the 2009 season.

Early years
Prior to coming to Texas Tech, Potts played at Abilene High School in Abilene, Texas. In his senior season, Potts threw for 3,162 yards and 53 touchdowns and garnered Class 5A Region and All-State teams. In addition to Texas Tech, Potts was recruited by Michigan, Baylor, Notre Dame, Oklahoma, Texas, and Texas A&M.

College career
Potts spent his 2006 freshman season as a "redshirt," seeing no game action but working as a member of the scout team. He then served as a backup to Graham Harrell for the 2007 and 2008 seasons, seeing limited playing time in several Tech blowout victories. In those two seasons, he compiled 669 yards passing, 5 touchdowns, and 2 interceptions.

2009 season
Potts was named Harrell's heir apparent and starter by Mike Leach in April 2009. Potts beat out classmate and former walk on Steven Sheffield and highly touted Redshirt Freshman Seth Doege. In his first game against the North Dakota Fighting Sioux, he completed 34 of 48 passes for 405 yards 2 touchdowns passing and 2 on the ground, and threw three interceptions in a 38–13 win. The next week against the Rice Owls, Potts threw 7 touchdowns and no interceptions in 55–10 blowout win. For his performance he was named Big 12 Offensive player of the week. The next week, Potts played his best game to date as he faced off against # 2 Texas Longhorns led by Colt McCoy. Potts started slow but ended up with 46 completions out of 62 attempts for 420 yards, 3 touchdowns and an interception. Potts took a vicious hit from Texas Defensive End Sergio Kindle that caused a turnover that in effect sealed the close win for the Longhorns, but got back up to throw his third touchdown of the game to Tramain Swindall. Despite losing 34–24, pundits noted that Potts outplayed McCoy with better numbers, and going into a hostile environment against a top 2 team and taking a vicious hit in the process. Tech fans were optimistic after the Texas game, however a shocking 29–28 loss to the Houston Cougars in which the Texas Tech offense failed to convert on fourth and goal from inside the one led to the Houston victory. Critics blamed Potts' inability to use his 6'6 frame to punch the ball in and seal the victory. In the next game against the New Mexico Lobos, Potts started slow and was knocked out with a Concussion. With the game tied at 7 with a minute left, back-up Steven Sheffield came in and scored to give the Raiders the lead en route to a 48–28 win. Potts was taken to the hospital and sat out the next 2 games, as Sheffield led Tech to blowout wins over Kansas State and Nebraska 66–14, and 31–10, respectively. Potts found himself back as the starter against the Texas A&M Aggies as Sheffield broke his foot against Nebraska. Potts played poorly and was benched by Leach and was replaced Seth Doege to the chants from the crowd of "No more Potts." Tech lost to A&M 52–30. Doege started the next game against the Kansas Jayhawks but was largely ineffective and Potts led the Raiders to a 42–21 win off the strength of the ground game. Potts had a fairly effective game despite a loss to Oklahoma State, 24–17 in the next game. Potts delivered his biggest win to date, a 41–13 drubbing of the Oklahoma Sooners and finished the season with a 20–13 win over the Baylor Bears, giving Tech an 8–4 overall record and 5–3 in Big 12 play.

2009 Alamo Bowl
Tech was invited to the Alamo Bowl to play against Michigan State. Potts was given the start in the Alamo Bowl, despite a healthy Steve Sheffield. Potts was effective for most of the game, but was pulled late in the 4th quarter by the interim staff, as Mike Leach had been fired earlier in the week. With Tech behind, Sheffield rallied Tech to two late scores to beat the Spartans 41–31. Potts was named offensive MVP with 29–43 passing for 372 yards and 2 touchdowns.

2010 season

After battling against Steven Sheffield for the starting quarterback job in spring and summer practices, Potts was named the starter for the 2010 season under new Red Raider head coach Tommy Tuberville and offensive coordinator Neal Brown. Potts suffered a hand injury in spring 2010 workouts and missed the spring Red-Black scrimmage. However, he was named the starter for Tech's season opener against SMU. Potts threw for 359 yards, completing 34 of 53 passes, in Tech's win over SMU. Potts started every game for Tech during the season except for the Nov 6 game against No. 14 Missouri. Sheffield started the Missouri game, but Potts came in shortly before halftime and led Tech to a 24–17 upset win over the Tigers. Potts was named the AT&T/ESPN All-America Player of the Week after passing for a Cotton Bowl-record 462 yards in Tech's 45–38 win over Baylor on Oct. 9.  In his final home game, against Houston on Nov 27, Potts threw for 373 yards in a 35–20 win over the Cougars. For the season, Potts finished with 3,726 passing yards, completing 369 of 551 passes (67.0 percent) with 35 touchdowns and 10 interceptions. He finished his final season as Tech's fourth-ranked all-time leader in passing yards (7,835) and the school's third-ranked all-time leader in touchdown passes thrown with 62.

2011 TicketCity Bowl
Texas Tech faced Northwestern in the inaugural TicketCity Bowl, played on January 1, 2011, in the historic Cotton Bowl stadium. Potts threw for 369 yards, completing 43 of 56 passes in Tech's 45–38 win over the Wildcats. Potts connected with former high school teammate Lyle Leong Jr. for two touchdown and also had scoring passes to Austin Zouzalik and Tramain Swindall. Potts also scored one touchdown on a perfectly executed trick play, a double pass from Potts to Zouzalik and back to Potts. For his efforts, Potts was named offensive Most Valuable Player for the game.

College statistics

Professional career

St. Louis Rams
Potts went undrafted in the 2011 NFL Draft and was later signed by the St. Louis Rams on July 26, 2011, but was waived on August 15.

San Diego Chargers
In May 2012, Potts was signed as a free agent and agreed to terms with the San Diego Chargers after a workout with the team.  He was subsequently released.

Personal life
Potts is a member of the Catholic Church. Potts is a Republican. As of 2011, Potts was engaged to Erin Methvin, alumna of Lubbock Christian University.

See also
2007 Texas Tech Red Raiders football team
2008 Texas Tech Red Raiders football team

References

External links
Player bio at Texas Tech athletics

1987 births
Living people
American football quarterbacks
American members of the Churches of Christ
Texas Republicans
Texas Tech Red Raiders football players
St. Louis Rams players
Players of American football from Texas